Hraschina may refer to:

 Hrašćina, a municipality in the Krapina-Zagorje County in Croatia.
 Hraschina meteorite, official name of a meteorite fallen in 1751 in Croatia near Hrašćina.